CNRD may refer to:

National Council for Renewal and Democracy, a Rwandan political party
National Committee of Reconciliation and Development,  junta of Guinea